Junius Podrug (born 1947) is an American author and lawyer. He was a defense attorney on the Chippendales dancers' federal murder and wrongful death legal cases. His fiction and non-fiction books have been published in twenty-eight countries under his own and four other names. His first novel, Frost of Heaven, was selected as Best First Novel by the Rocky Mountain News Unreal World book awards.

Biography
Podrug was born in Nevada City, California, in 1947. He is the son of Mate, a miner, and Angela, a hotel maid. He is married to Hildegard Krische. He graduated from California State University (Sacramento) with a B.A. in political science, and McGeorge School of Law with a J.D.. He practiced law in Sacramento and Beverly Hills before becoming a full time writer.

Other works
Podrug's short story, "Vendetta", was published by Ellery Queen's Mystery Magazine in October 1973 in its Department of First Stories.

He is the writer, director and co-producer of a low budget independent film, Night of the Naked Dead.

Bibliography
Frost of Heaven (1992, 1998)
Presumed Guilty (1997, also published as Winterkill)
Dark Passage (2002)
Feathered Serpent 2012 (2010)

With Harold Robbins
Sin City (2002, uncredited)
Heat of Passion (2003, uncredited)
The Betrayers (2004)
Blood Royal (2005)
The Devil to Pay (2006)
The Looters (2007)
The Deceivers (2008)
The Shroud (2009)
The Curse (2011)

With Gary Jennings
Aztec Blood (2001) (with Robert Gleason, uncredited)
Aztec Rage (2006) (with Robert Gleason)
Aztec Fire (2008) (with Robert Gleason)
Apocalypse 2012 (2009) (with Robert Gleason)
The 2012 Codex (2010) (with Robert Gleason)
Aztec Revenge (2012)

Non-fiction
Stop Being a Victim
The Disaster Survival Bible

References

External links
Official website

20th-century American novelists
21st-century American novelists
American male novelists
Living people
20th-century American male writers
21st-century American male writers
20th-century American non-fiction writers
21st-century American non-fiction writers
American male non-fiction writers
1947 births